The 2016 Buffalo Bulls football team represented the University at Buffalo in the 2016 NCAA Division I FBS football season. The Bulls were led by second-year head coach Lance Leipold. The team played their home games at University at Buffalo Stadium and competed as a member of the East Division of the Mid-American Conference. They finished the season 2–10, 1–7 in MAC play to finish in last place in the East Division.

Schedule

Schedule Source:

Roster

Game summaries

Albany

@ Nevada

Army

@ Boston College

Kent State

Ball State

@ Northern Illinois

Akron

@ Ohio

Miami (OH)

@ Western Michigan

@ Bowling Green

References

Buffalo
Buffalo Bulls football seasons
Buffalo Bulls football